Wallsend Boys Club is an English youth football club based in Wallsend, North Tyneside. The club is well known for producing professional footballers; more than 65 players from the club have gone on to play professionally, some of them even playing for the England side.

History
The club was founded in 1904 by the employees and directors of Swan Hunters Shipyard in order to provide recreational activities for the apprentices and young people in the area and initially specialised in boxing. The original club premises were a series of wooden huts on Station Road, erected by workers from the shipyard.  A fire destroyed the original premises and work commenced on the current club building in 1964, which was opened on 16 December 1966.

Club activities in the early days were mainly snooker, trampolining, judo, table tennis, cross country running and football. Various fund raising activities were held, including a "pram push" across England and a 24-hour relay race from Wallsend to Edinburgh Castle and back. 
  
In 1975, the club opened seven days a week and formed a separate sub-committee for 11-a-side football. Over the years, the 11-a-side representative teams have won hundreds of trophies in local and national competitions. The club has gained a formidable reputation for the early development of many professional footballers.

In 2008, the club was awarded the Freedom of the City of North Tyneside, in recognition of what the deputy mayor called the club's "factory line of talent", and for its community work.
 
In June 2011, the club opened its first football centre, prior to which they had to play on park and local authority pitches. The facility, for which negotiations began in 2006, which is situated next to Wallsend Sports Centre on Rheydt Avenue, has:
two senior size grass pitches,
five junior size grass pitches,
one mini-soccer size grass pitch, and
a changing pavilion.

It was funded by grants of £850,000 from the Football Foundation, £150,000 from The FA and £301,000 from North Tyneside Council with the club itself raising £114,000 towards the scheme.

The Station Road headquarters of the club was demolished in the February and March 2012, following high winds in January which damaged one of the walls of the building.

Former players
Professional players to have played for the club include:

Elliott Anderson
Paul Baker
Steve Baker
Peter Beardsley 
Ian Bogie
Michael Bridges 
Steve Bruce 
Adam Campbell
Michael Carrick 
Phil Cavener
Vince Chapman
Lee Clark 
Leif Davis 
Tony Dinning
Robbie Elliott 
Nicky Evans
Graham Fenton  
Fraser Forster
Damon Gray
Joe Grey
Ray Hankin
Chris Hedworth
Rob Hindmarch
Shaun Hutchinson
Russell Irving
Dan Jones
Brian Laws 
Tony Lormor
Shaun Lowther
Kevin McDonald
Neil McDonald 
Mark Maley
Lee Novak
Derrick Parker
Ben Pringle
Phil Ray
Barry Richardson
David Robinson
David Roche
Jack Roscamp
Tony Sealy
Thomas Shaftoe
Alan Shearer 
Shola Shoretire 
Kevin Smith
Michael Smith
Eric Steele
Paul Stephenson
Mick Tait
Paul Tait
Jeff Tate
Les Taylor
Steven Taylor
Alan Thompson
Alan Waddle
Dean Walker
Mick Wardrobe
Ian Watson
Steve Watson 
Alex Whitmore
Tommy Widdrington
Jeff Wrightson

International representation
The club has had a representative at four of the nine FIFA World Cup finals since 1986, with the two exceptions coming in 1994, when the England national football team did not qualify, and 2002.  In 1986 and 1990 Peter Beardsley starred for England. In 1998 Alan Shearer was England captain. Michael Carrick made appearances for England in both the 2006 and 2010 tournaments. Fraser Forster was in the 2014 squad, as well as the Euro 2016 squad, but did not make an appearance in either tournament.

Alan Thompson received one full cap for England in 2004, and Fraser Forster did the same in 2013 and went on to receive another five caps over the next three years, while numerous other former players have made youth or B international appearances.

References

External links
Club website

 
Youth football clubs in England
Football clubs in Tyne and Wear
Association football clubs established in 1938
Football academies in England
Football clubs in England
1904 establishments in England
Association football clubs established in 1904